Sabine Fuss is a German climate scientist. She heads the "Sustainable Resource Management and Global Change" working group at the Mercator Research Institute on Global Commons and Climate Change (MCC). She is a professor at Humboldt University of Berlin.

Life 
Fuss earned a master's degree in international economics and a doctorate in sustainable development in the energy sector from Maastricht University. She worked at the International Institute for Applied Systems Analysis. In 2018 she was appointed a professor at the Humboldt University of Berlin.

Work 
Fuss's research interests include resource management with a particular focus on systems analysis, decision-making under uncertain conditions, integrated assessment with a focus on mitigation of and adaptation to climate change, mechanisms for carbon dioxide management, climate-compatible development, and climate policy. Most recently, she has studied carbon dioxide removal. She believes "The longer the world waits with ambitious climate protection measures, the more crucial the importance of CO2 removal technologies."

Fuss is one of the authors of the IPCC Special Report on Global Warming of 1.5 °C (2018).

Selected publications

Notes

References

External links 
 Homepage at the MCC

Academic staff of the Humboldt University of Berlin
Living people
Intergovernmental Panel on Climate Change lead authors
21st-century German women scientists
21st-century German scientists
German climatologists
Women climatologists
Maastricht University alumni
Year of birth missing (living people)